Eduardo Chávez Hernández (born January 25, 1987, in Los Reyes, Michoacán) is a former Mexican football defender who last played for Morelia, having previously played for Toros Neza in the Ascenso MX.

References

1987 births
Living people
Footballers from Michoacán
Mexican footballers
Association football defenders
Chiapas F.C. footballers
Toros Neza footballers
Alebrijes de Oaxaca players
Correcaminos UAT footballers
Atlético Morelia players
Liga MX players